The 2016 Texas Longhorns football team, known variously as "Texas", "UT", the "Longhorns", or the "Horns", was a collegiate American football team representing the University of Texas at Austin as a member of the Big 12 Conference in the 2016 NCAA Division I FBS football season; the 2016 team was the 124th to represent the university in college football. The Longhorns were led by third-year head coach Charlie Strong with Sterlin Gilbert as the team's offensive coordinator and Vance Bedford as the team's defensive coordinator. The team played its home games at Darrell K Royal–Texas Memorial Stadium in Austin, Texas, where the team is based.

Following a 5–7 season the previous year, the 2016 preseason involved several coaching changes for the Texas Longhorns football team. A search for a new offensive coordinator carried over from the end of the 2015 season, and culminated with the hires of offensive coordinator Sterlin Gilbert alongside offensive line coach Matt Mattox in December 2015. Departures and dismissals of specialists at the running back, defensive back, and wide receiver coaching positions led to hires at those vacancies in February 2016. Despite the shakeup, the Longhorns signed a consensus top-15 ranked recruiting class on National Signing Day, with additional transfers in the successive months improving the recruiting class to a consensus top-10 nationally.

After a second-straight 5–7 season that included the Longhorns' first loss to Kansas since 1938, the University of Texas fired Charlie Strong at a morning meeting on November 26, 2016.

Preseason

The Texas Longhorns finished the previous season with an overall record of 5–7, with a 3–5 record in Big 12 play; this placed Texas at seventh in the conference. Although select 5–7 football teams, namely those with the highest Academic Progress Rates (APR), filled several bowl games as an inadequate number of teams finished with the six wins traditionally required for bowl eligibility, Texas did not have a high enough APR; thus, the season ended with a regular season upset win over the Baylor Bears.

Towards the end of the 2015 season, Texas' administration reportedly began showing interest in hiring then TCU co-offensive coordinator Sonny Cumbie to serve as an offensive coordinator for the Longhorns in 2016. This interest culminated in several meetings and an eventual offer by Charlie Strong in early December 2015; Cumbie eventually turned down the offer. Concurrently, the Longhorns administration expressed interest in Tulsa co-offensive coordinator Sterlin Gilbert for the same job at Texas, among other candidates. Despite media reports suggesting that Gilbert took the Texas job on December 11, later reports from the same day indicated that Gilbert had also turned down the coaching offer. Allegedly, inconsistencies with the exact terms of the offer led to Gilbert's initial refusal. However, further negotiations between Texas and Gilbert resulted in the official announcement of Texas' hiring of the former Tulsa offensive coordinator, along with Gilbert's offensive line coach, Matt Mattox, on December 12, 2015. Consequently, offensive coordinator Shawn Watson and offensive line coach Joe Wickline, who had remained a part of the Texas coaching staff since 2014, were released.

Concurrent with Texas' search for a new offensive coordinator, Missouri reportedly showed interest in Texas special teams and tight end coach Jeff Traylor. On December 16, Traylor was offered and accepted a pay raise from the Longhorns, suggesting that Traylor's scheduled interview with the Missouri Tigers was eventually canceled. Traylor later interviewed for the vacant head coach position at Texas State in January 2016, though Texas State would eventually hire Everett Withers as head coach. Traylor's son, Jordan Traylor, became a graduate assistant for the Longhorns on January 8 after finishing his collegiate football career at Texas A&M. On January 18, Texas running backs coach Tommie Robinson announced his departure from Austin to join the University of Southern California (USC) coaching staff for the same position, meaning that none of initial offensive staff hires made by Charlie Strong at the beginning of his first year at Texas will be set to coach the Longhorns in 2016. On February 11, Texas defensive backs coach Chris Vaughn was dismissed from the team after he was implicated in an ongoing NCAA investigation of the Ole Miss Rebels football team. The same day, wide receivers coach Jay Norvell left the University of Texas to coach at the same position at Arizona State, resulting in a total of three significant coaching vacancies at Texas by mid-February.

On February 12, Texas was set to reportedly hire Purdue defensive backs coach Taver Johnson; however, Texas would eventually hire Arkansas defensive backs coach Clay Jennings on February 17 to fill the same vacant position at Texas. Concurrently, the Longhorns hired two other coaches to fill Texas coaching vacancies, including former Toledo Rockets co-offensive coordinator Anthony Johnson as a running backs coach on February 13 and former Indianapolis Colts running backs coach Charlie Williams as a wide receivers coach on February 15. Around the same time, Texas A&M pitched an offer to Longhorns defensive line coach Brick Haley, though Haley decided to stay with the Longhorns.

Spring practice
The Longhorns began spring practice on March 7, which subsequent practices interspersed over the following weeks. Charlie Strong noted that the top three priorities for spring practice were to develop Texas' defensive linemen, wide receivers, and quarterbacks.  Spring practices began utilizing shoulder pads on March 11. On March 29, Jerrod Heard, who had served as the starting quarterback for Texas during several games in 2015, suffered a shoulder injury during practice. Although no timetable for his return to practice was set, the university indicated the injury was a minor sprain of his throwing shoulder. By April 5, the Longhorns had completed ten spring practice sessions.

Spring game

Source:

Texas' annual Orange-White spring game was set for April 16 at the Longhorns' home field in Austin, Texas; this placed the game 141 days before Texas' first official game against Notre Dame. Although the game was scheduled to play out over four quarters, inclement weather forced the spring game to end after halftime. Throughout the game, the 'Texas' team represented the first-team, while the 'Horns' represented the second-team. The spring game featured the hurry-up offensive scheme introduced by new offensive coordinator Sterlin Gilbert.

The Texas side of the game began with the football to start the game, and were eventually stopped by the Horns defense to a punt following a three-and-out. Quarterback Shane Buechele threw a 27-yard pass to Armanti Foreman on the ensuing drive to score a touchdown for the Horns; running back Chris Warren III would run a 51-yard touchdown on the following drive roughly a minute later for Texas, tying the game at 7–7 to end the first quarter. The five subsequent drives ended without any scores, though one drive ended in a failed 46-yard field goal attempt from Mitchel Becker. In the second quarter, Texas would score two additional touchdowns on a run from D'Onta Foreman and a long pass from Shane Buechele to John Burt; following the last touchdown of the game, both teams turned the ball over via an interception and a fumble. At halftime, Charlie Strong ended the spring game due to worsening weather conditions, concluding a 21–7 victory for the Texas team.

Fall practice
Camp practices in the leadup to the 2016 football season began on August 6. During fall practice, former starting quarterback Jerrod Heard was moved to the wide receiver position.

Recruiting

Following the 2016 recruiting cycle, a total of 28 players signed their National Letter of Intent to become a part of the 2016 Texas Longhorns football team. Prior to National Signing Day on February 3, 2016, 17 players had pledged their commitments to the Longhorns, while four of these players became early enrollees at the beginning of the 2015-16 spring semester. Of the 28 recruited players, all are from high schools in the United States, with none originating from other countries or from junior colleges. Of Texas' recruits, 23 were from Texas, 4 were from Louisiana, and 1 was from California. Collin Johnson committed to the Longhorns on April 17, 2014, becoming the first player to announce their commitment to the team. As the final previously-uncommitted Texas recruit to submit his letter of intent on National Signing Day, Jordan Elliot initially became the final recruit of the 2016 class on February 3, 2016. However, offensive guard Patrick Hudson would later sign is letter of intent well after National Signing Day on June 29. Two players announced their commitments in 2014, while ten did so in 2015. Five additional players committed to Texas in 2016 prior to National Signing Day, with another four uncommitted players signing their letters of intent in June 2016. Thirteen of Texas' recruits primarily served as offensive players, while another thirteen primarily served as defensive players. Two additional recruits, Lil'Jordan Humphrey and Donovan Duvernay, were recruited as a general purpose athlete.

On January 2, 2016, offensive tackle prospect Jean Delance of Mesquite, Texas announced his commitment to the Longhorns during the 2016 Under Armour All-America Game. On the weekend of January 16–17, Texas hosted 19 prospective and committed players on official visits to the campus; of the 19 prospects, the Longhorns would eventually sign 15 recruits. Shortly afterwards, former longtime Kansas State commit Zach Shackelford, an offensive linesmen, flipped his commitment to the Longhorns. Two days later, Shackelford, along with three other Longhorns recruits, became early enrollees as Texas for the school year's spring semester; as a result, all four were eligible for spring practice with the Longhorns football team in 2016.  On January 24, former cornerback prospect Obi Eboh dropped his commitment to Texas, instead opting to sign with Stanford. On National Signing Day, seven players announced their commitment to the Texas football team and faxed their letters of intent. According to ESPN's metrics, Texas' recruiting class had climbed over 20 spots to hold a top 10 ranking following the prolific recruiting day. Among these recruits was runningback Erick Fowler, who had been committed to Louisiana State (LSU) up until National Signing Day. Following National Signing Day, Texas' 2016 recruiting class was ranked as the 13th, 10th, 13th, and 8th best in the country by 247Sports.com, ESPN, Rivals.com, and Scout.com, respectively. All four recruiting services listed Texas as having the best 2016 recruiting class in the Big 12 Conference. After additional recruits signed in June 2016, Texas' recruiting class was ranked 9th, 7th, and 3rd by 247Sports.com, Rivals.com, and Scout.com, respectively.

In June 2016, the firing of then-Baylor head coach Art Briles in the aftermath of the Baylor University football scandal resulted in four players formerly committed to Baylor singing with the Texas football team; the players were able to change schools after Baylor failed to submit their national letters of intent to Big 12 Conference offices, allowing the players to request a release from the letter.

Both 247Sports.com and Scout.com listed safety Brandon Jones of Nacogdoches High School as Texas' highest rated recruit; both services considered Jones to be the best safety prospect in the United States for 2016. According to ESPN, Texas' highest rated recruit was linebacker prospect Jeffrey McCulloch; fourteen of Texas' twenty-eight recruits, including McCulloch, were listed on the ESPN 300, which listed the 300 top recruiting prospects nationwide according to the network's metrics. Rivals.com listed linebacker and former LSU-commit Erick Fowler as Texas' top recruit for 2016. Several Texas recruits received various accolades during the 2016 recruiting cycle. Quarterback Shane Buechele was one of 18 quarterbacks who participated in the 2016 Elite 11 quarterback competition; Buechele also participated in Nike's The Opening alongside future Texas recruits Eric Cuffee, Erick Fowler, and Jeffrey McCulloch. Three players formed a part of the 2016 U.S. Army All-American Bowl,
 while four participated in the 2016 Under Armour All-America Game;
another three recruits played in the 2016 Semper Fidelis All-American Bowl.

Recruits

Personnel
A search for a new Texas offensive coordinator in December 2015 concluded with the official hiring of former Tulsa co-offensive coordinator Sterlin Gilbert on December 12, 2015 as both an offensive coordinator and quarterbacks' coach. As part of the negotiations, Matt Mattox, the former Tulsa offensive line coach, was also named to the same position at Texas. Both coaches were given three-year coaching contracts, with Gilbert and Mattox awarded $850,000 and $550,000 annual salaries, respectively. The move implicated the release of Shawn Watson and Joe Wickline, who had occupied the newly changed coaching positions since 2014. Jay Norvell, who had served as a co-offensive coordinator for much of the 2015 season, became solely a wide receivers' coach following the coaching changes.

On December 26, 2015, Texas defensive tackle Hassan Ridgeway declared for the 2016 NFL Draft, thus forgoing his fourth year as part of the Longhorns football team. Jermaine Roberts, a cornerback recruit for Texas in 2014, announced his transfer from the Texas football team in February 2016; former Longhorns defensive backs Adrian Colbert and Bryson Echols similarly announced to transfer from the university in February. In addition to Texas' 2016 recruiting class, former LSU placekicker and 2015 Lou Groza Award semifinalist Trent Domingue signed a financial aid agreement to join the Texas football program as a graduate transfer on July 24, 2016.

Roster

Preseason coaching changes

Returning starters
Texas' 2016 team will feature seven offensive players and ten defensive players that started games for the team in 2015, as well as punter Michael Dickson. In addition, fifteen other players that saw substantial playing time in 2015 are set to return as part of the Longhorns in 2016. According to ESPN, the total number of combined starts among Texas players returning in 2016 was 310, with 111 of those starts from returning offensive players and 119 from defensive players; Texas' 310 combined starts ranked third among teams in the Big 12.

Offense

Defense

Special teams

Award watch lists
In addition to individual awards, linebacker Malik Jefferson was named to Sporting News' Preseason All-American first team on July 1. Jefferson was also named to the Preseason All-Big 12 team on July 13, alongside cornerback Davante Davis and offensive linesmen Patrick Vahe and Connor Williams. The Big 12 also identified Jefferson as the Big 12 Preseason Defensive Player of the Year.

Walter Camp Award
Malik Jefferson

Doak Walker Award
D'Onta Foreman
Chris Warren III
Outland Trophy
Connor Williams

Bednarik Award
Malik Jefferson
Bronco Nagurski Award
Malik Jefferson
Butkus Award
Malik Jefferson

Depth chart

Schedule

Texas will play its first three games against teams outside the Big 12; two of these will be at home and one will be played away. The opening game against Notre Dame will be the second consecutive year in which the two teams have played as part of a scheduling agreement made in 2010. Although the game was initially scheduled on September 3, in April 2016 the game was moved to the following day to maximize national coverage. Similarly, a deal made in 2009 pits Texas and California Golden Bears football in a non-conference game, while the game between Texas and the University of Texas at El Paso (UTEP) replaces an initially scheduled home-and-home series between Texas and Minnesota.

On November 24, 2015, the Big 12 released its tentative schedule for intra-conference games, occupying the remaining nine games on Texas' schedule; four of these games are to be played at home, four away, and one game, the Red River Showdown, will be played in Dallas, Texas. Although the Red River Showdown is set to take place on a team-neutral field, Oklahoma is designated as the home team on even-numbered years; thus, Texas will serve as the away team during the 2016 edition of the rivalry game. Conference games are set to be played in a round-robin format, and thus all Big 12 teams will face all other teams within the conference. Kickoff times for Texas' games against UTEP, California, and TCU were released by the conference on June 1.

The Longhorns will play on consecutive weeks from September 4 to November 24 with the exception of the week of September 24, which serves as a bye week. In addition, Texas will not play a game on the week of December 3 in contrast to six other Big 12 teams. All games will be played on Saturday except for the game against Notre Dame, which will be played on Sunday, and the game against TCU, which will be played on a Friday. The game between Texas and TCU was initially scheduled for Thanksgiving, but was rescheduled for November 25 in February 2016; Texas had switched between playing TCU or Texas Tech on Thanksgiving after Texas A&M left the Big 12 for the Southeastern Conference (SEC) in 2012.

Largest attendance recorded at Darrell K Royal–Texas Memorial Stadium. The record would later be broken on September 15, 2018 with an attendance of 103,507 against USC.

Media affiliates
Texas' flagship radio station is KTXX-FM ("The Horn", 104.9 FM) based in Austin, Texas. Fourteen other FM stations and twenty-one AM stations cover UT's football games around Texas, while a pair of FM and AM stations based in Austin cover Texas games in Spanish. Texas Longhorns football games are broadcast via satellite radio on Sirius channel 117, XM channel 202, and SiriusXM channel 969.

On June 1, the Big 12 announced that the Red River Rivalry game between Texas and Oklahoma would be televised by Fox Sports 1, making it the first time since 1998 that a FOX-affiliated channel covered the game; between 1998 and 2016, the American Broadcasting Company (ABC) carried the rivalry game.

Season summary

Rankings

The preseason Coaches Poll was released on August 4, 2016, with Texas outside of the top 25 but receiving 34 points; this marked the first time the Longhorns appeared in any of the major ranking polls since Week 7 of 2015. Similarly, the preseason AP Poll, released on August 21, 2016, placed Texas outside of the top 25 but awarded the Longhorns 12 points. In both polls, Texas was the fifth highest ranked team in the Big 12. Following a victory against Notre Dame in the season opener, the Longhorns were ranked in the top-25 for the first time since December 2013. Texas moved from an unranked position to 11th in the AP Poll, marking the highest rank given to Texas by the poll since October 2012.

Game summaries

Week 1: vs. No. 10 Notre Dame

Sources:

Leading up to Texas' opening game against Notre Dame, the Fighting Irish were favored to win by three to four points. The game between Texas and Notre Dame was to be the debut of Bevo XV, the fifteenth of a succession of live Texas longhorn mascots that traditionally appear at Texas' football games. Shortly before the game, Texas' depth chart was released, indicating that both quarterbacks Tyrone Swoopes and Shane Buechele would share playing time, though Buechele was reportedly expected to start at the position. Buechele became the first true freshman to start for Texas in a season opener since 1944. At the game, 102,315 people were in attendance at Darrell K. Royal–Texas Memorial Stadium, setting an attendance record for the venue and beating the former record of 101,851 set during the 2012 game between Texas and West Virginia.

The game began with Texas kicking off to Notre Dame, after which the Fighting Irish were able to score on their first possession following a 54-yard run by running back Tarean Folston and a 13-yard touchdown pass from DeShone Kizer to wide receiver Equanimeous St. Brown. The Longhorns would also score a touchdown on their ensuing drive, scoring off of a 19-yard pass from Shane Buechele to wide receiver Armanti Foreman; a string of three-and-outs by both teams kept the score at 7–7 by the end of the first quarter. In the second quarter, both Texas quarterbacks Buechele and Swoopes capped off scoring drive with 1-yard touchdown runs, while Notre Dame scored one touchdown in the quarter on another touchdown pass from Kizer to St. Brown. At the end of the first half, the Longhorns led 21–14.

Notre Dame kicked off to Texas to begin the second half, with the Longhorns quickly scoring just two plays later on a long 72-yard pass from Buechele to wide receiver John Burt. A forced three-and-out by the Texas defense allowed Texas to regain possession and gain a 17-point lead after a 25-yard field goal by recently transferred placekicker Trent Domingue. Despite the double-digit lead, the Fighting Irish would score 21 unanswered points in the third and fourth quarters off of two passing and one rushing touchdown orchestrated by Kizer; an additional 3 points were prevented after defensive end Naashon Hughes blocked a field goal attempt by Justin Yoon at the end of the third quarter. Following these scores, Notre Dame would lead 35–31 after having trailed since the end of the first half. Texas regained the lead late in the fourth quarter on a 19-yard touchdown by running back D'Onta Foreman; however, the subsequent point after touchdown (PAT) attempt was blocked by Notre Dame and returned 98 yards for a defensive PAT, tying the game at 37–37. The three ensuing drives ended in no scores, leaving the game tied in regulation and bringing the game into overtime. Texas began the overtime period on offense and were able to score a touchdown via a 3-yard touchdown run by Swoopes; Notre Dame quickly responded with a 25-yard screen pass from Kizer to receiver C. J. Sanders to tie the game at 44–44. In second overtime, the Longhorns defense held the Fighting Irish to a 39-yard field goal. With Texas now only in need of a touchdown to win the game, Swoopes scored on a 6-yard touchdown run after six consecutive rushing plays, ending the game in a 50–47 Longhorns victory.

The 97 combined points were the sixth-most in Longhorns history and were capped by only the third overtime game and second overtime history in the program's history. The win also marked the first win against a top-10 ranked team at home since 2008 and their first win against such a team in week one since 1983. The game's telecast on ABC/ESPN garnered a 7.0 television rating, becoming the network's second most viewed opening game in addition to breaking viewer records for opening games in seven television markets. In addition, the game's broadcast broke average minute audience, unique viewer, and total minutes watched records on WatchESPN, ESPN's Internet streaming service. With the victory, Texas moved to 1–0 for the year.

Week 2 (vs. UTEP)

Sources:

Entering week 2, Texas was favored to win by roughly 30 points against UTEP, and began a game as a ranked team for the first time in Charlie Strong's tenure at Texas. The game started with the Longhorns kicking off to UTEP, though the Miners' first three drives ended in three-in-outs, with the Texas defense holding UTEP to 8 total yards on those drives. A touchdown pass by Buechele on Texas' first offensive possession was negated after wide receiver Jacorey Warrick fumbled the ball just before crossing the end zone, resulting in a touchback and awarding UTEP with possession of the ball. A subsequent 29-yard touchdown pass by Buechele to Heard marked the first score of the game. Later in the first quarter, a UTEP punt was blocked by defensive back Brandon Jones, leading to a Longhorns field goal to put Texas up 10–7 at the end of the first quarter. The blocked punt was Texas' first since their 2012 game against Texas Tech. At the beginning of the second quarter, Texas was not able to capitalize on a fumble recovery, and Miners running back Aaron Jones would score on a 51-yard touchdown run. However, a 43-yard field goal by Domingue and 8-yard touchdown pass by Buechele to Warrick later in the second quarter placed the Longhorns further ahead at the end of the first half, 20–7.

Texas received the ball to begin the second half, but did not score until the second drive of the half following a 1-yard touchdown run by running back Chris Warren III. A 46-yard touchdown pass by Buechele to receiver Dorian Leonard midway through the third quarter gave Texas a 34–7 lead. The Miners fumbled the ball twice on punt returns in the third quarter, but were able to recover the football each time; however, UTEP was unable to score at any point in the game outside of their sole rushing touchdown in the second quarter. Only one score occurred in the fourth quarter on a 7-yard touchdown pass from Buechele to Heard, and the game ultimately ended with a score of 41–7, with the Longhorns winning. The win marked the 50th win in Charlie Strong's head coaching career, including his tenure at Louisville. Ten players made their first collegiate football appearances during the game, including three true freshmen. With the victory, Texas moved to 2–0 for the year.

Week 3 (at California)

Sources:

Prior to the game, bookmakers favored Texas to win by around seven points. Following a string of injuries that occurred during Texas' first game against Notre Dame, all starting players that had sat out during the game against UTEP were expected to play against California.

Texas' first road game of the season began with California receiving the ball, and the Golden Bears' first drive led to a 29-yard touchdown pass from quarterback Davis Webb to receiver Jordan Veasy; Texas would also score on their first possession off of a 4-yard run by Chris Warren III,  tying the game early in the first quarter. California's next two drives ended in a turnover on downs and a punt, allowing the Longhorns to pull ahead 17–7 with a Trent Domingue field goal and another rushing touchdown by Warren III; however, the Golden Bears were able to score a rushing touchdown at the end of the first quarter to narrow the score to 17–14. The second quarter featured a combined 37 points between the two teams, with scoring plays that included a 41-yard pass from Buechele to Warrick and a safety for the Longhorns and a 29-yard pass from Webb to receiver Melqui Stovall. The blocked punt by Brandon Jones that resulted in a safety was his second of the season, marking the first time that a Longhorns player blocked multiple punts in the same season since 2012. Texas quarterbacks Swoopes and Buechele were each intercepted once in the second quarter, though Buechele left the game briefly in the quarter due to a possible injury after starting the game. A long 51-yard field goal attempt by Domingue to end the half missed, keeping California in the lead 35 33 to the half.

Neither California nor Texas were able to score in the third quarter, in stark contrast to the first half. While Domingue missed a 49-yard field goal wide right for the Longhorns on their first possession of the half, all other drives for both teams ended in punts in the third quarter. Texas would score first in the fourth quarter on a 47-yard run by Foreman, taking only one play to reach the end zone. The Golden Bears would quickly respond with a 76-yard drive capped off by a 1-yard rushing touchdown by Webb and subsequent Chad Hansen two point conversion. A 10-yard touchdown pass by Buechele to receiver Jake Oliver briefly tied the game 43–43, only for California to reclaim the lead with a 12-yard touchdown pass from Webb to Hansen. Although Texas regained possession of the ball with under four minutes remaining, the Longhorns were unable to make a first down. The Texas defense was unable to hold the California offense to a three-and-out on their last possession, allowing the Golden Bears to end the game with a quarterback kneel and win 50–43. With the loss, Texas moved to 2–1 for the year.

Week 4 (Bye week)
On September 23, starting offensive guard Kent Perkins was arrested for DWI, and as a result was suspended for the following week's game against Oklahoma State.

Week 5 (at Oklahoma State)

Sources:

Oklahoma State was favored to win by 2–3 points before the game.

Week 6 (vs. Oklahoma)

Sources:

Oklahoma was favored to win by 13–14 points.

Week 7 (vs. Iowa State)

Sources:

Week 8 (at Kansas State)

Sources:

Week 9 (vs. Baylor)

Sources:

Week 10 (at Texas Tech)

Sources:

Week 11 (vs. West Virginia)

Sources:

Week 12 (at Kansas)

Sources:

The overtime loss to Kansas was the Longhorns' first loss to the Jayhawks since 1938.

Week 13 (vs. TCU)

Sources:

Notes

References

Texas
Texas Longhorns football seasons
Texas Longhorns football